Christian Salaba (6 April 1971 – 19 November 2016) was an Austrian footballer.

References

1971 births
2016 deaths
Association football defenders
Austrian footballers
Austrian Football Bundesliga players
First Vienna FC players
SK Rapid Wien players
SK Vorwärts Steyr players
SV Stockerau players
FC Admira Wacker Mödling players
SV Würmla players
SV Mattersburg players